Mount Pearl-Southlands is a provincial electoral district in Newfoundland and Labrador. As of  2016 there are 14,386 people living in the district.

Mount Pearl-Southlands includes part of the City of Mount Pearl and the Southlands portion of the City of St. John's. The district was created following the 2015 electoral districts boundaries review. The majority of Mount Pearl-Southlands was previously the district of Mount Pearl South. The district also includes parts of the former district of Kilbride and a small part of Mount Pearl North.

Members of the House of Assembly
The district has elected the following Members of the House of Assembly:

Election results

|-

|-

|-

References

Newfoundland and Labrador provincial electoral districts
Mount Pearl